This is a list of crossings of the River Soar, the principal river of Leicestershire in the Midlands of England. Listed in the table are those crossings that have been identified downstream of the Soar Brook confluence, near Sharnford, to the last crossing near Ratcliffe-on-Soar upstream of Soar Mouth where the river meets the Trent.

At Aylestone in Leicester the Grand Union Canal meets the Soar, to form the Soar Navigation. Downstream from this point the navigation and river become intertwined with weirs and bypass channels, one prominent section is the Mile Straight constructed for flood alleviation in the 1890s. It has four listed crossings along its length, including Upperton Road, Mill Lane, Newarke, and West Bridge. The current West Bridge built in 1891, replaced an earlier stone bridge with four arches, that once had a bridge chapel. Crossing the Old Soar nearby, is Bow Bridge, although rebuilt in 1863, the earlier medieval bridge was strongly associated with the local folklore surrounding the death of Richard III.

Other notable crossings include the scheduled packhorse bridges at Aylestone and Enderby Mill, with the bridges at Cossington, Barrow, Cotes and Kegworth all being Grade II listed. Near Mountsorrel, a listed red brick bridge from 1860 has been described as “an impressive local landmark.”

Crossings

Bibliography

References

External links

Bridges in Leicestershire
Soar
Soar
Soar